The Ooldea dunnart (Sminthopsis ooldea), also called Troughton's dunnart after the person who found the species, is an Australian marsupial similar to the hairy-footed dunnart. It is greyish-yellow on its upper body and white on the underside with dark patches on its crown, forehead and in front of the eyes, and a pink thinly furred carrot-shaped tail.

Distribution and habitat
The Ooldea dunnart is found from the Tanami Desert in the Northern Territory, south to Ooldea in South Australia and east to neighbouring areas of Western Australia. The type of habitat it inhabits includes arid eucalypt and acacia woodlands, heathlands mallee scrub and hummock grasslands, low shrubland, open scrub and tall open shrubland.

Social organisation and breeding
The Ooldea dunnart has eight young between September and November but, since the species is not much studied, not much more is known. It is nocturnal and has been found in burrows and hollow logs.

Diet
It is believed, from evidence gathered, that this species eats insects.

References

External links
Australian Biological Resources Study

Dasyuromorphs
Mammals of Western Australia
Mammals of South Australia
Mammals of the Northern Territory
Marsupials of Australia
Mammals described in 1965